T Robinson better known as Robin Thirumala ( born on 30 May 1964) is an Indian film director, screenwriter , music composer , lyricist and founder of the 4 am Club Foundation.

Career
Thirumala started his career as a journalist in 1985. He entered the world of cinema by assisting noted director duo Siddique-Lal. Later, he made many hit films in Malayalam film industry by working as an independent director, screenwriter, music composer and lyricist.

He gave his first Script to Siddiqoe Lal in 1992, for the film Makkal Mahatmyam. His early work focused on writing comedy films, but he later also wrote political action thrillers. Indraprastham was one example of this.

Thirumala composed a song in collaboration with Raveendran Master in 2004 for the film Maratha Nadu, directed by K. K. Haridas. Thirumala also received acclaim for the lyrics for a song from the film 'Adharam'. After a gap of four years he composed nine songs for his directorial debut 'Chembada'. Several songs from the movie were critically and commercially acclaimed. He named himself as 'Musafir' for the film and performed one song written by himself. After three years he wrote the music for the film 'Veendum kannur'.

Other works
Thirumala also has written commercial jingles for many known brands such as Chic king fried chicken, Kaula Masala, Kairali Airlines, and others.

Filmography

References

Malayalam film directors
Malayalam screenwriters
1964 births
Living people